John Worthington Ames (October 22, 1793 – October 31, 1833) represented Dedham, Massachusetts in the Great and General Court. He was the son of Fisher Ames and the brother of Seth Ames. He never married and always lived with his mother.

He was born October 22, 1793, in Dedham, Massachusetts. Ames was a lawyer and president of the Dedham Bank from June 16, 1829, until his death. He died October 31, 1833.

References

Works cited

Members of the Massachusetts General Court
1793 births
1822 deaths
Harvard College alumni
Lawyers from Dedham, Massachusetts
Businesspeople from Dedham, Massachusetts
19th-century American businesspeople
Politicians from Dedham, Massachusetts